Aftabuddin Alam (born 17 November 1993) is an Indian cricketer. He played T20 for the Rajasthan cricket team in 2015.

References

External links
 

1993 births
Living people
Indian cricketers
21st-century Indian people